Artificial intelligence art is any artwork, particularly images and musical compositions, created through the use of artificial intelligence (AI) programs, such as text-to-image models and musical generators.

Early history 
Artificial intelligence was founded as an academic discipline in 1956, and in the decades since has experienced several waves of optimism. Since its founding, researchers in the field of artificial intelligence have raised philosophical arguments about the nature of the human mind and the ethical consequences of creating artificial beings endowed with human-like intelligence; these issues have previously been explored by myth, fiction and philosophy since antiquity.

Tools and processes

Imagery 

Many mechanisms for creating AI art have been developed, including procedural "rule-based" generation of images using mathematical patterns, algorithms which simulate brush strokes and other painted effects, and artificial intelligence or deep learning algorithms, such as generative adversarial networks (GANs) and transformers.

One of the first significant AI art systems is AARON, developed by Harold Cohen beginning in the late 1960s at the University of California at San Diego. AARON is the most notable example of AI art in the era of GOFAI programming because of its use of a symbolic rule-based approach to generate technical images. Cohen developed AARON with the goal of being able to code the act of drawing. In its primitive form, AARON created simple black and white drawings. Cohen would later finish the drawings by painting them. Throughout the years, he also began to develop a way for AARON to also paint. Cohen designed AARON to paint using special brushes and dyes that were chosen by the program itself without mediation from Cohen.

Generative adversarial networks (GANs) were designed in 2014. This system uses a "generator" to create new images and a "discriminator" to decide which created images are considered successful. More recent models use Vector Quantized Generative Adversarial Network and Contrastive Language–Image Pre-training (VQGAN+CLIP).

DeepDream, released by Google in 2015, uses a convolutional neural network to find and enhance patterns in images via algorithmic pareidolia, thus creating deliberately over-processed images. After DeepDream's release, several companies released apps that transform photos into art-like images with the style of well-known sets of paintings.
The website Artbreeder, launched in 2018, uses the models StyleGAN and BigGAN to allow users to generate and modify images such as faces, landscapes, and paintings.

Several programs use text-to-image models to generate a variety of images based on various text prompts. They include OpenAI's DALL-E, which released a series of images in January 2021,  Google Brain's Imagen and Parti which was announced in May 2022, Microsoft's NUWA-Infinity, and Dream by Wombo.
The input can also include images and keywords and configurable parameters, such as artistic style, which is often used via keyphrases like "in the style of [name of an artist]" in the prompt and/or selection of a broad aesthetic/art style.

On 22 August 2022, Stable Diffusion was released, making the technology much more accessible and free to use on personal hardware as well as extendable by third-parties (i.e. other software projects). This enabled the development of further applications and extensions, such as plugins for Krita, Photoshop, Blender, and GIMP. The Automatic1111 Stable Diffusion UI is a popular web-based open source user interface for using the tool on one's own computer including, continuously integrated, new features (such as "Inpainting" or "Textual Inversion"). The web interface by Stability.ai that allows running the software without any new installation is called DreamStudio.

There are many other AI art generation programs including simple consumer-facing mobile apps and Jupyter notebooks that require powerful GPUs to run effectively. Examples include Midjourney among many others.

Impact and applications 
The exhibition "Thinking Machines: Art and Design in the Computer Age, 1959–1989" at MoMA provided an overview of AI applications for art, architecture, and design. Exhibitions showcasing the usage of AI to produce art include the 2016 Google-sponsored benefit and auction at the Gray Area Foundation in San Francisco, where artists experimented with the DeepDream algorithm and the 2017 exhibition "Unhuman: Art in the Age of AI", which took place in Los Angeles and Frankfurt. In spring 2018, the Association for Computing Machinery dedicated a magazine issue to the subject of computers and art. In June 2018, "Duet for Human and Machine", an art piece permitting viewers to interact with an artificial intelligence, premiered at the Beall Center for Art + Technology. The Austrian Ars Electronica and Museum of Applied Arts, Vienna opened exhibitions on AI in 2019. Ars Electronica's 2019 festival "Out of the box" explored art's role in a sustainable societal transformation.

Examples of such augmentation may include e.g. enabling expansion of noncommercial niche genres (common examples are cyberpunk derivatives like solarpunk) by amateurs, novel entertainment, novel imaginative childhood play, very fast prototyping, increasing art-making accessibility and artistic output per effort and/or expenses and/or time – e.g. via generating drafts, inspirations, draft-refinitions, and image-components (Inpainting).

Synthetic media, which includes AI art, has been described in 2022 as a major technology-driven trend to affect business in the coming years.

Prompt engineering and sharing 
There are platforms for sharing, trading, searching, forking/refining and/or collaborating on prompts for generating specific imagery from image generators. Prompts are often shared along with images on image sharing-websites such as reddit and AI art-dedicated websites. They are not the complete input or details used for the generation of images.

Development 
Additional functionalities are under development and may improve various applications or enable new ones – such as "Textual Inversion" which refers to enabling the use of user-provided concepts (like an object or a style) learned from few images. With textual inversion, novel personalized art can be generated from the associated word(s) (the keywords that have been assigned to the learned, often abstract, concept) and model extensions/fine-tuning (see also: DreamBooth).

Generated images are sometimes used as sketches or low-cost experimentations or illustration of proof-of-concept-stage ideas – additional functionalities or improvements may also relate to post-generation manual editing (polishing or artistic usage) of prompts-based art (such as subsequent tweaking with an image editor). In the case of Stable Diffusion, the main pre-trained model is shared on the Hugging Face Hub.

Music 
 For example, AI can be used in the adjustable generation of novel sounds and samples that can be used by artists for music tracks.

Other 
Some prototype robots can create what is considered forms of art – such as dynamic cooking robots that can taste and readjust.

There also is AI-assisted writing beyond copy-editing (including support in the generation of fictional stories such as helping with writer's block or inspiration or rewriting segments).

AI could be and has been used in video game art beyond imagery only, especially for level design (e.g. for custom maps) and creating new content or interactive stories in video games.

Analysis
In addition to the creation of original art, research methods that utilize AI have been generated to quantitatively analyze digital art collections. This has been made possible due to large-scale digitization of artwork in the past few decades. Although the main goal of digitization was to allow for accessibility and exploration of these collections, the use of AI in analyzing them has brought about new research perspectives.

Two computational methods, close reading and distant viewing, are the typical approaches used to analyze digitized art. Close reading focuses on specific visual aspects of one piece. Some tasks performed by machines in close reading methods include computational artist authentication and analysis of brushstrokes or texture properties. In contrast, through distant viewing methods, the similarity across an entire collection for a specific feature can be statistically visualized. Common tasks relating to this method include automatic classification, object detection, multimodal tasks, knowledge discovery in art history, and computational aesthetics. Whereas distant viewing includes the analysis of large collections, close reading involves one piece of artwork.

Researchers have also introduced models that predict emotional responses to art such as ArtEmis, a large-scale dataset with machine learning models that contain emotional reactions to visual art as well as predictions of emotion from images or text.

Sales 
An auction sale of artificial intelligence art was held at Christie's Auction House in New York in 2018, where the AI artwork Edmond de Belamy sold for $432,500, which was almost 45 times higher than its estimate of $7,000–$10,000. The artwork was created by "Obvious", a Paris-based collective.

Criticism, issues and controversy

Copyright
Ever since artists began using AI to create art in the 20th century, the use of AI-generated art has sparked a number of debates. In the 2020s, some of those debates concerned whether AI art can be defined as art or not and concerning the impact it will have on artists.

In 1985, intellectual property law professor Pamela Samuelson considered the legal questions surrounding AI art authorship as it relates to copyright: who owns the copyright when the piece of art was created by artificial intelligence? Samuelson's article, "Allocating Ownership Rights in Computer-Generated Works," argued that rights should be allocated to the user of the generator program. In response to the same question, a 2019 Florida Law Review article has presented three possible choices. First, the artificial intelligence itself becomes the copyright owner. To do this, Section 101 of the Copyright Act would need to be amended to define "author" as a natural person or a computer. Second, following Samuelson's argument, the user, programmer, or artificial intelligence company is the copyright owner. This would be an expansion of the "work for hire" doctrine, under which ownership of a copyright is transferred to the "employer." Finally, no one becomes the copyright owner, and the work would automatically enter public domain. The argument here is that because no person "created" the piece of art, no one should be the copyright owner.

In 2022, coinciding with the rising availability of consumer-grade AI image generation services, popular discussion renewed over the legality and ethics of AI-generated art. Of particular issue is the use of copyrighted art within AI training datasets: in September 2022, Reema Selhi, of the Design and Artists Copyright Society, stated that "there are no safeguards for artists to be able to identify works in databases that are being used and opt out." Some have claimed that images generated by these models can bear an uncanny resemblance to extant artwork, sometimes including remains of the original artist's signature. Such discussion came to a head in December, when users of the portfolio platform ArtStation staged an online protest against nonconsensual use of their artwork within datasets: this resulted in opt-out services, such as "Have I Been Trained?," increasing in profile, as well as some online art platforms promising to offer their own opt-out options. According to the US Copyright Office, artificial intelligence programs are unable to hold copyright.

In January 2023 three artists — Sarah Andersen, Kelly McKernan, and Karla Ortiz — filed a copyright infringement lawsuit against Stability AI, Midjourney, and DeviantArt, claiming that these companies have infringed the rights of millions of artists by training AI tools on five billion images scraped from the web without the consent of the original artists. The same month, Stability AI was also sued by Getty Images for using its images in the training data.

Concerns about impact on artists
Some artists in 2022 raised concerns about the impact AI image generators could have on their ability to earn money, particularly if AI images are used to replace artists working in illustration and design. In August 2022, a text-to-image AI illustration won the first-place $300 prize in a digital art competition at the Colorado State Fair. Digital artist R. J. Palmer said in August 2022 that "I could easily envision a scenario where using AI a single artist or art director could take the place of 5-10 entry level artists... I have seen a lot of self-published authors and such say how great it will be that they don’t have to hire an artist," adding that "doing that kind of work for small creators is how a lot of us got our start as professional artists." Polish digital artist Greg Rutkowski said in September 2022 that "it's starting to look like a threat to our careers," adding that it has gotten more difficult to search for his work online because many of the images returned by search engines are generated by AI that was prompted to mimic his style.

Issues of deepfakes
As with other types of photo manipulation since the early 19th century, some people in the early 21st century have been concerned that AI could be used to create content that is misleading, known as "deepfakes".

See also
 Algorithmic art
 Applications of artificial intelligence#Art
 Computational creativity
 Cybernetic art
 Generative art
 List of artificial intelligence artists
 Neural style transfer
 Synthetic media
 Synthography

References

External links 
 Aggregated resources for Stable Diffusion, on the Stable Diffusion reddit community

AI Tool

 
Visual arts
Digital art
Computer art
Art controversies